The Son of Davy Crockett is a 1941 American Western film written and directed by Lambert Hillyer. The film stars Wild Bill Elliott, Iris Meredith, Dub Taylor, Kenneth MacDonald, Richard Fiske and Eddy Waller. The film was released on July 15, 1941, by Columbia Pictures.

Plot

Cast
Wild Bill Elliott as Dave Crockett
Iris Meredith as Doris Mathews
Dub Taylor as Cannonball
Kenneth MacDonald as King Canfield
Richard Fiske as Jesse Gordon
Eddy Waller as Grandpa Mathews
Donald Curtis as Jack Ringe
Paul Scardon as Zeke
Edmund Cobb as Lance 
Steve Clark as Curly
Harrison Greene as President Ulysses S. Grant
Lloyd Bridges as Sammy
Stanley Brown as Clint
Eddie Laughton as Burns
Martin Garralaga as Lopez
Francis Sayles as Doc Banks

References

External links
 

1941 films
American Western (genre) films
1941 Western (genre) films
Columbia Pictures films
Films directed by Lambert Hillyer
American black-and-white films
1940s English-language films
1940s American films